The gens Balventia was a Roman family during the late Republic.  It is known chiefly from a single individual, Titus Balventius, a primus pilus in the command of Quintus Titurius Sabinus in Gaul.  He was severely wounded in the attack made by Ambiorix in 54 B.C.

See also
 List of Roman gentes

Footnotes

Roman gentes